The Aeronautique Club de France (ACDF) is an aeronauts then airmen and airwomen French association created on October, 20th 1897 by Mr Saunier.

Turned into Flying Club, it is based on Meaux-Esbly airfield (ICAO: LFPE).

Notes

External links
 ACdF web site

Clubs and societies in France
Organizations established in 1897
1897 establishments in France